Steven Seokho Choi (born January 15, 1944) is an American politician who served as a member of the California State Assembly representing the 68th Assembly District from 2016 to 2022. A Republican from Orange County, California, he previously served two terms as Mayor of Irvine, California.  In 1998, he became the first Asian-American elected to the Irvine Unified School Board and served two consecutive terms there before becoming the first Asian American to have been elected to a four-year term on the Irvine City Council and one of two Korean Americans on the council.

Early life and education 
Steven Choi was born in 1944 in Naju area of Jollanamdo, South Korea during Japanese occupation of Korea. Choi earned his B.A. from Kyung Hee University in 1966. In August 1968, Choi moved from South Korea to the United States as a Peace Corps language instructor for the United States Department of State. He then continued his post-graduate education, earning his master's degree in library science from Louisiana State University in 1971 and Ph.D. in library and information science at the University of Pittsburgh in 1976.

Career

Educator 
Choi has taught at several universities and colleges including the University of Southern California; University of California, Irvine; California State University, Los Angeles; Henderson State University; Saddleback College; and most recently Coastline Community College. He founded and serves as director of Dr. Choi's Academy, a tutoring and academic enrichment business.

Politics 
Choi was elected to the Irvine Unified School District School Board in 1998 and reelected in 2002.  He was elected to the Irvine City Council in 2004, becoming the first Asian American elected to a four-year term on the council. He and Sukhee Kang (elected to a two-year term on the same day) became the first two Asian Americans and Koreans elected to the Irvine City Council.  Choi served on the Irvine City Council until 2012, when he defeated councilman Larry Agran in the mayoral election and was elected to a two-year term as Irvine's mayor. He was later reelected as mayor in 2014.

The Irvine City Council is composed of 5 people, including the mayor.  The council has 4 Republican members (Choi, Christina Shea, Lynn Schott, and Jeff Lalloway) and 1 Democratic member (Beth Krom).  Choi is a part of the conservative council majority, and has been able to promote programs he supports and stop policies he opposes from being enacted. During the course of new sister city negotiations, he successfully opposed the One-China principle demanded by Shanghai's Xuhui government in the People's Republic of China, which would have required Irvine to abandon its existing long-term sister city relationship with Taoyuan, Taiwan.

Choi serves as Chairman of the Orange County Public Library Advisory Board, which consists of Mayors and Council members from 27 Orange County cities, and is also Chairman of the Irvine Library Advisory Committee. He serves on the Orange County Great Park Corporation Board, the Irvine Redevelopment Agency, the Orange County Sanitation District Board and other countywide committees. His vision is to build a large Orange County/City Metropolitan Library at the Great Park.

In addition, Choi is a member of the Concordia University President's Advisory Council and is Irvine’s representative to Growth Management Areas 4 and 9 and the Newport Bay Watershed Executive Committee. He formerly represented the 71st Assembly District on the Orange County Republican Party Central Committee. On June 3, 2008, he became the only incumbent to not be re-elected to the Orange County Republican Party Central Committee, coming in seventh with only 6.5% of the available vote.  He is also a member of the Local Elected Officials Association and the 400 Club.

In 2010, Choi sought election to the California State Assembly, but narrowly lost the Republican primary to Donald P. Wagner, who went on to win the general election.

In 2016, Choi won election to the California State Assembly, narrowly defeating Anaheim City Councilman Harry Sidhu in the primary and winning the general election with 60% of the vote.

Personal life 
With his wife, Janie, and their two children, Choi has lived in Irvine since 1993. He previously lived in Mission Viejo from 1981 until 1993. Both of their children attended public schools in the Irvine Unified School District. His son, Daniel, is a physician at Kaiser Permanente in Orange County. His daughter, Michelle, is an attorney working in Irvine.

Electoral history

2016 California State Assembly

2018 California State Assembly

2020 California State Assembly

2022 California State Assembly

See also
 History of the Korean Americans in Los Angeles

References

External links 
 
 Steven Choi – Official campaign web site
 Join California Steven Choi

1944 births
South Korean emigrants to the United States
Living people
Mayors of Irvine, California
Republican Party members of the California State Assembly
American mayors of Korean descent
Louisiana State University alumni
People from Irvine, California
University of Pittsburgh alumni
University of California, Irvine faculty
University of Southern California faculty
California city council members
California politicians of Korean descent
21st-century American politicians
California State University, Los Angeles faculty
Kyung Hee University alumni
People from Seoul
People from Naju
Asian conservatism in the United States